Loret Sadiku (born 28 July 1991) is a Kosovan professional footballer who plays as a defensive midfielder for Hammarby IF in Allsvenskan.

Early life
Born in SFR Yugoslavia, Sadiku was raised in Sweden and started to play youth football with local club Hånger IF in Värnamo. In 2003, he joined the youth setup of IFK Värnamo, the town’s biggest club.

Club career

IFK Värnamo
In 2009, Sadiku was promoted to Värnamo's first team and made his professional debut in Ettan, Sweden's third tier. He was part of what would be known as a golden generation in the history of the club, together with players like Viktor Claesson, Simon Thern, Niklas Hult and Joseph Baffo. In 2010, Värnamo won a promotion to Superettan.

In 2011, led by head coach Jonas Thern, Värnamo finished 13th in the Superettan table. Sadiku made 29 league appearances, scoring twice, and appeared in both relegation play-off legs against Väsby United, which the club won by 3–0 on aggregate.

Helsingborgs IF
On 20 January 2012, Sadiku transferred to Allsvenskan club Helsingborgs IF. Two months later, he won the 2012 Svenska Supercupen with the club, through a 2–0 win against AIK. As defending Swedish champions, Helsingborg finished 6th in Allsvenskan, in which Sadiku made 19 appearances. Throughout the season, he also played five games in 2012–13 UEFA Champions League, before Helsingborg was knocked out in the play-off round by Celtic by 0–4 on aggregate.

In 2013, Sadiku played 27 league games, scoring twice, as Helsingborg finished 5th in the Allsvenskan table. Halfway through the 2014 season, after making 11 league appearances, Sadiku sought a move elsewhere and reportedly attracted interest from rival Malmö FF.

Turkish Süper Lig
On 28 June 2014, Sadiku signed a three-year contract with Mersin İdman Yurdu, newly promoted to the Turkish Süper Lig, together with Abdul Khalili from Helsingborg. 

On 17 August 2016, Sadiku transferred to Kasımpaşa for a fee of €2 million, signing a three-year contract. On 12 January 2019, Sadiku signed a new three and a half year-deal with the club.

Hammarby IF
On 18 February 2022, Sadiku signed a three-year contract with Hammarby IF in Allsvenskan, thus returning to Sweden after eight years abroad. Sadiku featured in the final of the 2021–22 Svenska Cupen, in which Hammarby lost by 4–5 on penalties to Malmö FF after the game ended in a 0–0 draw. In early July, Sadiku tested positive for COVID-19 and suffered from persistent symptoms that kept him sidelined for almost two months.

International

Sweden

Under-21
On 31 May 2012, Sadiku made his debut for Sweden U21 after being named in the starting line-up in a 2013 UEFA Under-21 qualification against Ukraine U21 and was nominated "Newcomer of the year".

Kosovo
On 2 March 2014, Sadiku received a call-up from Kosovo for the nation's first permitted by FIFA match against Haiti and made his debut after being named in the starting line-up.

Career statistics

Club

References

External links

1991 births
Living people
Sportspeople from Pristina
Swedish people of Kosovan descent
Swedish people of Albanian descent
Kosovan emigrants to Sweden
Association football defenders
Kosovan men's footballers
Kosovo international footballers
Swedish men's footballers
Sweden under-21 international footballers
IFK Värnamo players
Helsingborgs IF players
Mersin İdman Yurdu footballers
Kasımpaşa S.K. footballers
Hammarby Fotboll players
Allsvenskan players
Superettan players
Ettan Fotboll players
Süper Lig players
Kosovan expatriate footballers
Expatriate footballers in Turkey
Kosovan expatriate sportspeople in Turkey